On 20 June 2020, shortly before 19:00 BST, a man with a knife attacked people who were socializing in Forbury Gardens, Reading, Berkshire, United Kingdom. Three men died from their wounds, and three other people were seriously injured. A 25-year-old Libyan male refugee named Khairi Saadallah was arrested nearby shortly afterwards. Saadallah was a former member of the Libyan militant group Ansar al-Sharia. He was charged with three counts of murder and three counts of attempted murder; he pleaded guilty. In January 2021, Saadallah was sentenced to a whole-life term.

Attack 

Using an  kitchen knife, Saadallah stabbed people in the eye, neck, head and back. A witness said the stabbing was "completely random". At 18:56, officers from Thames Valley Police went to the park, responding to reports of a stabbing with multiple casualties.

Saadallah was chased, tackled and pinned to the ground by police officers on Friar Street – near its junction with the Inner Distribution Road – approximately five minutes after the first 999 call was made. He was arrested, initially on suspicion of murder, and later re-arrested while in custody under Section 41 of the Terrorism Act 2000.

A Black Lives Matter protest had taken place at the park earlier in the day, but police said that the attack was not associated with the protest.

Attacker
The perpetrator was Khairi Saadallah, who was 25 years old at the time. He was arrested near the park shortly after the attack. He was born in Libya and is from a well-off, middle-class family. In 2018, he was given permission to stay in the United Kingdom after claiming asylum in 2012. A family member said he had post-traumatic stress from the civil war and had come to the United Kingdom from Libya in 2012 to escape from violence there, living first in Manchester. In the war, he was part of Ansar al-Sharia, a group now proscribed in the UK, and stated falsely in his asylum application that he was not involved in combat. In 2018, he was given five years' permission to stay in the UK.

Saadallah was convicted six times for 15 crimes between 2015 and 2019, of which eight were violent crimes, two involved possession of a knife and two involved racially or religiously aggravated harassment. He was said to have smoked cannabis and had regular visits from a mental health professional. A security source told Reuters that the suspect had come to the attention of Britain's domestic security agency MI5 in 2019 over intelligence that he aspired to travel for extremist purposes, and he had been investigated over jihadist concerns. In 2017, prison staff noted that he was spending a lot of time with Abu Izzadeen of the proscribed group Al-Muhajiroun. He had been released from prison 17 days before the attack, having been sentenced for assault and possessing a bladed article: the UK was unable to deport him because it would have breached his human rights to send him back to Libya.

Saadallah yelled "Allahu Akbar" during the attack, and a Muslim bystander heard him say "God accept my jihad" in Arabic. After his arrest, Saadallah told police that "[he] was going to paradise for the jihad what [he] did to the victims". Police later found images of the World Trade Center and Islamic State flag on his phone, alongside videos about Jihadi John, an ISIS terrorist. Saadallah also had a crucifix tattoo, had prayed in church and told police that he was both Muslim and Catholic; his defence lawyer argued that this indicated that he did not have a serious devotion to radical Islam.

The Guardian reported that sources said that Saadallah was initially believed by the intelligence agencies to have mental health problems. Sky News additionally reported that he lived in a flat in Reading. It was later confirmed that Saadallah faked a mental illness, and was acting in pursuit of his extremist ideology.

Casualties
The attack resulted in three fatalities at the scene, as well as three seriously injured with knife wounds to their head, face, hand, and back. The Thames Valley Air Ambulance, Hampshire & Isle of Wight Air Ambulance and London's Air Ambulance were deployed to the scene, and South Central Ambulance Service deployed their Hazardous Area Response Team. Of the injured people, two were admitted to the Royal Berkshire Hospital's emergency department, in Reading. One other injured person was taken to the John Radcliffe Hospital in Oxford, but was discharged without being admitted. One of the injured was a friend of the three fatalities.

The three men who were killed were friends and members of the local LGBT+ community. Post-mortem examinations showed that they each died of a single stab wound; two were stabbed in the neck, and one in the back.

Investigation and trial
Initial police statements from Thames Valley Police on the evening of the incident said that the incident was "not currently being treated as a terrorism incident" and that they were "keeping an open mind as to the motivation", although counter terrorism officers were deployed. The next morning, Counter-Terrorism Policing South East stated that the attacks were "a terror incident". It took over command of the incident from the local police, with support from MI5. On 22 June, police were granted a warrant to further detain Saadallah until 27 June.

Charges
On 27 June 2020, Saadallah was charged with three counts of murder and three counts of attempted murder.

Court proceedings
On 29 June 2020, Saadallah appeared by video link at Westminster Magistrates' Court charged with three counts of murder and three counts of attempted murder. The prosecutor said the accused was heard shouting words to the effect of Allahu Akbar. He was remanded in custody to appear at the Old Bailey. After appearing at the Old Bailey by video link from Belmarsh Prison, London, for preliminary hearings on 1 and 10 July, the judge set 30 November as a provisional date for a full trial.

Sentencing
On 11 November, Khairi Saadallah admitted three charges of murder and three of attempted murder. On 11 January 2021, he was given a whole-life term. The sentencing judge said that it was a terrorist attack and that the purpose was to advance an extremist Islamic cause. In October 2021 Saadallah was refused leave to appeal the sentence.

Reactions 
Prime Minister Boris Johnson expressed his condolences and thanked emergency services for responding to the scene. On the following morning, 21 June, Johnson met with senior ministers, police, and security officials at 10 Downing Street to be briefed on the events. Home Secretary Priti Patel and Labour Party Leader Keir Starmer both expressed concern over the incident.

The leader of Reading Borough Council said he was "shocked and appalled" by the "horrific and senseless attack", expressed his condolences, and thanked the emergency services for their response. The council issued a statement saying that their "thoughts and prayers are with the families of the three people who lost their lives, and for those who remain seriously injured", and announcing that their flag would fly at half mast for the day.

After Saadallah's conviction, the father of James Furlong, one of the victims, said that "there are now serious questions that need answering", in reference to how Saadallah avoided deportation despite his previous violent offences.

See also 

2017 London Bridge attack
2017 Westminster attack
2019 London Bridge stabbing
2020 Streatham stabbing
Glasgow hotel stabbings
List of prisoners with whole-life orders

References 

2020 in England
2020s in Berkshire
21st century in Reading, Berkshire
Attacks in the United Kingdom in 2020
Islamic terrorism in the United Kingdom
Islamic terrorist incidents in 2020
June 2020 crimes in Europe
June 2020 events in the United Kingdom
Mass stabbings in the United Kingdom
Murder in Berkshire
Stabbing attacks in 2020
Stabbing attacks in England
Terrorist incidents in the United Kingdom in 2020
Terrorist incidents involving knife attacks